A.F. Blakemore & Son Ltd is a  food retail, wholesale and distribution company, established in 1917. A.F. Blakemore & Son Ltd is the largest SPAR distribution centre in the UK.  The company's headquarters are in Willenhall, West Midlands, United Kingdom.

Businesses
A.F. Blakemore & Son Ltd is divided into several subsidiaries with different emphases and goals:

 Blakemore Retail, which owns and operates 260+ SPAR stores
 Blakemore Trade Partners, which supports A.F. Blakemore's independent SPAR estate
 Blakemore Wholesale Distribution, which provides retailers, vending operators and wholesalers with bespoke distribution solutions
 Blakemore Foodservice, which delivers catering products to schools, local authorities, public houses and restaurant chains nationwide
 Blakemore Fresh Foods, which is a meat trading, wholesaling and manufacturing operation that supplies the retail, food service and wholesale sectors
 Blakemore Design and Shopfitting, which specialises in the design and refurbishment of SPAR retail stores
 Blakemore Property, which deals with company site acquisitions and leasings

History
A.F. Blakemore & Son Ltd was started in 1917 as a counter service grocery store by Arthur Blakemore and his wife.  After early success, they branched into supplying other groceries, at first bags and other provisions, later with products for resale.

Arthur Blakemore was followed by his son, Frank, who in turn was followed by his son, Peter Blakemore. The company is still owned by the family.

A.F. Blakemore & Son Ltd was one of the first companies involved in symbol group trading in the 1950s.

References

External links

Retail companies of the United Kingdom
Companies based in Wolverhampton